The British Birthday Honours 1990 included a number of honours and awards to celebrate the 90th Birthday of Queen Elizabeth The Queen Mother.

Royal Victorian Order

Dame Grand Cross of the Royal Victorian Order (GCVO)

 Patricia, Dowager Viscountess Hambleden, DCVO.

Dame Commander of the Royal Victorian Order (DCVO)

 Frances Olivia Campbell-Preston, CVO.

Knight Commander of the Royal Victorian Order (KCVO)

 Major Arthur John Stewart Griffin, CVO.

Commander of the Royal Victorian Order (CVO) 

 Major George Raymond Seymour, LVO.
 Charles Murray Kennedy St. Clair, Lord Sinclair, LVO.

Lieutenant of the Royal Victorian Order (LVO) 

 Ian George Gill.

Member of the Royal Victorian Order (MVO) 

 Captain Giles Anthony Caybourne Bassett, Irish Guards.

Royal Victorian Medal

Royal Victorian Medal (Silver) 

 Donald McCarthy
 Sergeant (Acting Pipe Major) John Frederick James Spoore, London Scottish.

References

Birthday Honours
1990 awards in the United Kingdom
1990 in the United Kingdom
Queen Elizabeth The Queen Mother
British honours system